Kim Yong-bom (18 August 1902 – 7 September 1947) was the Secretary of the North Korean Branch Bureau of the Communist Party of Korea, making him the second leader of the first predecessor organisation of the current-day Workers' Party of Korea.

References

External links
 "Kim Tu-bong and Historical Linguistics" by Andrei Lankov

Korean independence activists
Korean communists
North Korean atheists
Leaders of the Workers' Party of Korea and its predecessors
1902 births
1947 deaths